ほ, in hiragana, or ホ in katakana, is one of the Japanese kana, each of which represents one mora. Both are made in four strokes and both represent .  In the Sakhalin dialect of the Ainu language, ホ can be written as small ㇹ to represent a final h sound after an o sound (オㇹ oh).

Stroke order

Other communicative representations

 Full Braille representation

 Computer encodings

References

Specific kana